Ionthas is a genus of moths in the subfamily Arctiinae.

Species
Ionthas ataracta Hampson, 1914
Ionthas thirkelli (Fraser, 1961)

References

Natural History Museum Lepidoptera generic names catalog

Lithosiini
Moth genera